Mahesh Aney is an Indian cinematographer.

Career
A Film and Television Institute of India (FTII) graduate with specialization in cinematography, Mahesh Aney has shot more than a thousand commercials including some award-winning films for Pepsi, Kellogg's, Tata Steel, Feviqik and Maggie noodles. He runs his own production house and has produced more than fifty commercials for brands like Coca-Cola, Vicks, Onida TV, Nivea Cream, Cinthol Soap and Johnnie Walker Golf.

Renowned for his deft camera work, brilliant eye, and penchant for turning the mundane into the magical on screen, Aney has also conceptualized and directed extremely popular television shows like Movers & Shakers, Bindaas Bol, Kya Masti Kya Dhoom and Wajood, which have won several awards. He has worked as a cinematographer on films like God Only Knows!, Tum: A Dangerous Obsession and the now-classic Swades.

Personal life
Mahesh Aney is married to Anjali Aney, has two children Aarti and Aditya, and lives in Mumbai.

Filmography

Feature films

See also
Indian cinematographers
Cinema of India

External links

Profile on Mahesh Aney from the Swades official website

Marathi film cinematographers
Living people
Year of birth missing (living people)
Best Cinematography National Film Award winners
Film and Television Institute of India alumni